The Omagh Thrust Fault is a geological fault in County Tyrone. It is of one of the most important structural discontinuities in Northern Ireland and an extension of the Highland Boundary Fault which runs through Scotland.

The fault occurred in the Caledonian orogeny, during a late stage of this period of mountain building. Older sequences of Dalriadan metamorphic strata were moved over younger Ordovician ones with the fault as their boundary.

There is access to a view of the fault at Mountfield Quarry, County Tyrone. This has been designated an Area of Special Scientific Interest.

See also
List of geological faults in Northern Ireland
Geology of Northern Ireland

References
General references
 Map sheet 44 (and accompanying memoir) of the series of 1:50,000 scale geological maps of Northern Ireland published by Geological Survey of Northern Ireland. 
 Lyle, P. 2003 Classic geology in Europe 5 The north of Ireland Terra Publishing, Harpenden

Footnotes 

Seismic faults of Northern Ireland
Geology of Northern Ireland
Geography of County Tyrone